Samo (–) founded the first recorded political union of Slavic tribes, known as Samo's Empire (realm, kingdom, or tribal union), stretching from Silesia to present-day Slovenia, ruling from 623 until his death in 658.  According to Fredegarius, the only contemporary source, Samo was a Frankish merchant who unified several Slavic tribes against robber raids and violence by nearby settled Avars, showing such bravery and command skills in battle that he was elected as the "Slavic king". In 631, Samo successfully defended his realm against the Frankish Kingdom in the three-day Battle of Wogastisburg.

Reign

The dates for Samo's rule are based on Fredegar, who says that he went to the Slavs in the fortieth year of Chlothar II (i.e., 623–24) and reigned for thirty five years. The interpretation that places the start of Samo's reign in the year of Fredegar's arrival has been questioned on the basis that the Wends would have most likely rebelled after the defeat of the Avar khagan at the First Siege of Constantinople in 626. The Avars first arrived in the Pannonian Basin and subdued the local Slavs in the 560s. Samo may have been one of the merchants who supplied arms to the Slavs for their frequent revolts. Whether he became king during a revolt of 623–24 or during one that inevitably followed the Avar defeat in 626, he definitely took advantage of the latter to solidify his position. A string of victories over the Avars proved his utilitas (usefulness) to his subjects and secured his election as rex (king). Samo went on to secure his throne by marriage into the major Wendish families, wedding at least twelve women and fathering twenty-two sons and fifteen daughters.

The most well-documented event of Samo's career was his victory over the Frankish royal army under Dagobert I in 631 or 632. Provoked to action by a "violent quarrel in the Pannonian kingdom of the Avars or Huns" during his ninth year (631–32), Dagobert led three armies against the Wends, the largest being his own Austrasian army. The Franks were routed near Wogastisburg (Latin castrum Vogastisburg), an unidentified location meaning "fortress/castle of Vogast." The majority of the besieging armies were slaughtered, while the rest of the troops fled, leaving weapons and other equipment lying on the ground. In the aftermath of the Wendish victory, Samo invaded Frankish Thuringia several times and undertook looting raids there. The Sorbian prince Dervan abandoned the Franks and "placed himself and his people under Samo's realm".

In 641, the rebellious duke of Thuringia, Radulf, sought an alliance with Samo against his sovereign, Sigebert III. Samo also maintained long-distance trade relationships. On his death, however, his title was not inherited by his sons. Ultimately, Samo can be credited with forging a Wendish identity by speaking on behalf of the community that recognised his authority.

Main sources
The main source of written information on Samo and his empire is the Fredegarii Chronicon, a Frankish chronicle written in the mid-7th century (c. 660). Though theories of multiple authorship once abounded, the notion of a single Fredegar is now common scholarly fare. The last or only Fredegar was the author of a brief account of the Wends including the best, and only contemporary, information on Samo. According to Fredegar, "Samo [was] a Frank by birth [or nation] from the pago Senonago", which could be present-day Soignies in Belgium or present-day Sens in France. Although he was of Frankish origin, Samo demanded that an ambassador (Sicharius) of Dagobert I (King of the Franks) put on Slavic clothes before entering his castle.

All other sources for Samo are derived from Fredegar and are much more recent. The Gesta Dagoberti I regis Francorum ("Deeds of King Dagobert I of the Franks") was written in the first third of the 9th century. The Conversio Bagoariorum et Carantanorum ("Conversion of the Bavarians and Karantanians") from Salzburg (the Bavarian ecclesiastic centre), written in 871–72, is a very tendentious source, as its name suggests. According mainly to the Conversio, Samo was a Karantanian merchant.

The sources Fredegar used to compile his Wendish account are unknown. A few scholars have attacked the entire account as fictitious, but Fredegar displays a critical attitude and a knowledge of detail that suggest otherwise. It is possible that he had an eyewitness in the person of Sicharius, the ambassador of Dagobert I to the Slavs. According to Fredegar, the "Wends" had long been subjects and befulci of the Avars. Befulci is a term, cognate with the word fulcfree found in the Edict of Rothari, signifying "entrusted [to guard]", from the Old German root felhan, falh, fulgum and Middle German bevelhen. Fredegar appears to have envisaged the Wends as a military unit of the Avar host. He probably based his account on "native" Wendish accounts. Fredegar records the story of the origo gentis (origin of the people) of the Wends. The Wends were Slavs, but Samo was the only king of the Wends, at least according to Fredegar.

It has also been suggested that Fredegar's sources may have been the reports of Christian missionaries, especially disciples of Columbanus and the Abbey of Luxeuil. If this is correct, it may explain why he is remarkably free of typical stereotypes of heathen Slavs, and why he was familiar with the Wends as a specifically pagan nation.

Popular literature
Few written works have their storyline taking place during Samo's Empire. One of them is the book Fire Worshipers.

See also
 Early Slavs
 History of Sorbs
 History of Slovenia
 History of the Czech lands
 History of Slovakia

Notes

References

 
 

658 deaths
7th-century Frankish people
7th-century rulers in Europe
7th-century Slavs
Frankish warriors
Samo
Medieval Slovakia
Medieval Slovenia
Year of birth unknown
Pannonian Avars
Founding monarchs
7th-century merchants

bg:Държава на Само